Big Bags is an album by vibraphonist Milt Jackson featuring big band performances arranged by Tadd Dameron and Ernie Wilkins recorded in 1962 and released on the Riverside label.

Reception
In his January 3, 1963 review, Down Beat magazine critic John S. Wilson described the album thus: "A big band made up of top New York studio men that varies slightly in the course of three recording sessions, plus arrangements by Tadd Dameron and Ernie Wilkins provide the surrounding in which Jackson works here". "This is not really a big band album but a group of solo settings."

The Allmusic review by Scott Yanow awarded the album 4 stars calling it a "melodic and always-swinging set".

Track listing
All compositions by Milt Jackson except as indicated
 "Old Devil Moon" (E. Y. Harburg, Burton Lane) - 3:07 
 "'Round Midnight" [Take 2] (Thelonious Monk) - 6:50 
 "'Round Midnight" [Take 1] (Monk) - 6:50 Bonus track on CD reissue 
 "The Dream Is You" (Tadd Dameron) - 3:11 
 "You'd Be So Nice to Come Home To" (Cole Porter) - 3:02 
 "Echoes" - 4:35 
 "If You Could See Me Now" (Dameron, Carl Sigman) - 5:17 
 "Star Eyes" [Take 5] (Gene de Paul, Don Raye) - 3:24 
 "Star Eyes" [Take 4] (de Paul, Raye) - 3:24 Bonus track on CD reissue  
 "Namesake" - 3:21 
 "If I Should Lose You" (Ralph Rainger, Leo Robin) - 3:36 
 "Later Than You Think" (Ernie Wilkins) - 4:43 
Recorded in New York City on June 19 & 20 and July 5, 1962

Personnel
Milt Jackson – vibes
Nat Adderley, Dave Burns, Bernie Glow, Ernie Royal, Doc Severinsen, Clark Terry, Snooky Young - trumpet
Jimmy Cleveland, Paul Faulise, Melba Liston, Tom McIntosh - trombone
Willie Ruff - French horn
Earle Warren - alto saxophone
George Dorsey - alto saxophone, flute
James Moody, Jerome Richardson  - alto saxophone, flute, tenor saxophone
Jimmy Heath - tenor saxophone, flute
Arthur Clarke, Tate Houston - baritone saxophone
Hank Jones - piano
Ron Carter - bass
Connie Kay - drums
Tadd Dameron, Ernie Wilkins - arranger, conductor

References 

Riverside Records albums
Milt Jackson albums
1962 albums
Albums produced by Orrin Keepnews